Niels or Nils Edward Liljenberg (February 10, 1869 – October 8, 1952) was an architect in early 20th century Utah.

Biography
Nils  Liljenberg  was born at Höör Municipality in Skåne,  Sweden. He received his architectural degree in 1888 at Swedish Polytechnic (Swedish: Svenska yrkeshögskolan) .  After working in New York City and on projects designing army barracks throughout Europe, he moved to Utah in 1902.  He became licensed to work in Utah as an architect in 1904 and began the firm Erskine & Liljenberg (1873 - 1956).  He was the architect for the Jordan School District where many of his works were completed including Jordan High School, Taylorsville, Forrest Dale, and Bonneview Elementary schools.  He also designed various civic buildings and residences.  Various works by Liljenberg's are listed on the National Register of Historic Places.

Personal life
Niels married Anna Sofia Sundh (1873-1956) and together they had three children.  Sometime around 1920, at seemingly the height of his career in Utah, Liljenberg and his family moved to El Cajon, California.  It is uncertain if he continued to work as an architect in California prior to his death on October 8, 1952.

Architectural works on the National Register of Historic Places
Beaver Opera House - 1909  (designed with Emil Maeser)
Alpine Stake Tabernacle- 1909 (designed with Emil Maeser)
Draper Park School
Murray LDS Second Ward Meetinghouse

Other buildings
Jordan High School (1914; razed 1996) *formerly NRHP listed
Ferry Hall - Westminster College (1908; razed 1987)
Eagle Fraternity Building - 404 S. West Temple, SLC (1905-currently The Bay Nightclub)
Salt Lake City YMCA (1904; razed)

Gallery

Notes

1869 births
1952 deaths
People from Höör Municipality
Swedish emigrants to the United States
20th-century American architects
Architects of Latter Day Saint religious buildings and structures
Architects from Utah
People from Scania
People from El Cajon, California